Paasio's first cabinet was the 50th government of Finland, which lasted from 27 May 1966 to 22 March 1968. It was a majority government based on the popular front model. The cabinet’s Prime Minister was Rafael Paasio.

Paasio's first cabinet made many political reforms, such as the primary school law, the party subsidies law, family and pension law, and the liberation of the sale of certain alcoholic beverages.

In October 1967, following a bad economic period which led to a low balance of international payments, the cabinet devaluated the markka by about 30 percent.

Rafael Paasio resigned as Prime Minister on 22 March 1968 following the failure of the Social Democratic Party in establishing good formal relations with the Soviet Union.

References

Paasio
1966 establishments in Finland
1968 disestablishments in Finland
Cabinets established in 1966
Cabinets disestablished in 1968